Egonu is a crater on Mercury. Its name was adopted by the International Astronomical Union in 2012, after Nigerian artist Uzo Egonu.

References

Impact craters on Mercury